Jacqueline Sade Altschuld (born May 11, 1995) is an American soccer player who is currently a midfielder for the San Diego Wave FC of the NWSL in the US. Prior to that, she played with UMF Tindastóll in Iceland and was part of the team that got promoted to the country's top tier league.

Early life and education 
Altschuld was born in Los Angeles to Elina Covarrubias and Bruce Altschuld. She grew up in Woodland Hills, and went to El Camino Real Charter High School, graduating in 2013. She attended University of San Diego and played through to her senior season in 2016.

Career 
After her senior year season at USD, she signed with the NWSL's Chicago Red Stars, but in 2017, would then play for Medkila IL in Norway's 1st Division league, Toppserien, making 10 appearances and scoring 1 goal.

In 2018, Altschuld played with Swedish club DFK Värmbol for 5 games.

From 2019 to 2021, Altschuld played for the Icelanic club UMF Tindastóll. She appeared in 55 games, scoring 20 goals. In the 2020 season, Altschuld helped the team to a first-place finish in Lengjudeild (2nd division) which got the team promoted to the top-tier Úrvalsdeild kvenna for the first time in club history.

On July 1, 2022, Altschuld signed as a national team replacement player for the San Diego Wave in the U.S. National Women's Soccer League. On July 3, she came off the bench in a match against the Washington Spirit. In August, she was signed to a contract for the rest of the 2022 season.

Notes

References 

1995 births
Living people
National Women's Soccer League players
Women's association football midfielders
American women's soccer players
San Diego Toreros women's soccer players
Medkila IL (women) players
Toppserien players
Ungmennafélagið Tindastóll women's football players
Úrvalsdeild kvenna (football) players
San Diego Wave FC
American expatriate women's soccer players
American expatriate sportspeople in Norway
Expatriate women's footballers in Norway
American expatriate sportspeople in Sweden
Expatriate women's footballers in Sweden
American expatriate sportspeople in Iceland
Expatriate women's footballers in Iceland
Soccer players from Los Angeles
People from Woodland Hills, Los Angeles
1. deild kvenna (football) players
Division 1 (Swedish women's football) players